Rhopalurus junceus, the red scorpion or blue scorpion, is an endemic species, one of 36 different types of scorpion found on Cuba and the Dominican Republic, as well as parts of Central America. It is called "blue scorpion" due to the peculiar blue tone on its tail and stinger; it is also known as "red scorpion" because it has a reddish dark body.

Habitat
Rhopalurus junceus can inhabit ecosystems ranging from savanna forests to semi-desert areas. They are commonly found under rocks or fallen trees and throughout the epiphytic vegetation within the Bromeliads.

Description 
Full-grown adults reach  in length. The body is yellowish brown, pink, orange, with a red or purple tail, a single stinger and the eight limbs darker, burgundy, purple or blackish, with a black triangle intercular. R. junceus has a life expectancy of three to five years, although lack of food results in only 15% reaching adulthood. Every year, hundreds of persons are stung by this scorpion in Cuba, but these stings are not dangerous because the venom has an LD50 of 8.0 mg / kg, which is far more venom than is carried in the stinger.

Escoazul
Escoazul or escozul (from escorpión azul - in Spanish: blue scorpion - the name by which it is known in Cuba) refers to a mixture used in Cuban traditional medicine as an anti-inflammatory. The composition may vary, but always contains a diluted dose of Rhopalurus junceus venom.

References 

Buthidae
Arthropods of Central America
Arthropods of Cuba
Arthropods of the Dominican Republic